Gino may refer to:

 Gino (given name)
 Gino (surname)
 Gino (film), a 1993 Australian film
 Gino the Chicken, Italian TV series

See also
 
Geno (disambiguation)
Gino's (disambiguation), various restaurants and fast-food chains
Gina (disambiguation)